Edwin Javier Cerrillo (born October 3, 2000) is an American professional soccer player who plays as a defensive midfielder for Major League Soccer club FC Dallas.

Career
Cerrillo committed to playing college soccer at the University of Maryland, but opted to sign a Homegrown Player contract with Major League Soccer side FC Dallas on February 14, 2019. He made his professional debut as a 79th-minute substitute in a 2–0 win over LA Galaxy on March 9, 2019.

International career
Cerrillo was called up on the back of good league form to the 2019 FIFA U-20 World Cup; although, he did not play in that tournament. He was subsequently called up to the United States national under-23 team for a camp later during the 2019 MLS season. He is also eligible to play for Mexico.

Personal life
Born in the United States, Cerrillo is of Mexican descent.

Career statistics

Club

Honors
North Texas SC
USL League One Regular Season Title: 2019
USL League One Championship: 2019

References

External links
 
 
 

2000 births
Living people
American soccer players
Association football midfielders
FC Dallas players
Homegrown Players (MLS)
Major League Soccer players
North Texas SC players
People from Frisco, Texas
Soccer players from Texas
Sportspeople from the Dallas–Fort Worth metroplex
United States men's under-20 international soccer players
USL League One players